The Tal-Qadi Stone is a Maltese documentary film produced by Chris Micallef and Maurice Micallef with assistance from the television channel One. It received the Best Director Award-Documentary at the 2007 New York International Independent Film and Video Festival .

The documentary was the only Maltese entry in this festival, which also screened 88 productions from around the world.

References
The Sunday Times of Malta, of 1 April 2007, page 28. 

Maltese documentary films
2007 films
2007 documentary films